Silvestras is a Lithuanian masculine given name. It is a cognate of the English language given name Sylvester and the French language given name Sylvestre. Notable people with the name include:
Silvestras Guogis (born 1990), Lithuanian hurdler and sprinter
Silvestras Leonas (1894–1959), Lithuanian military officer, judge, politician
Silvestras Žukauskas (1860–1937), Lithuanian military general

References

Lithuanian masculine given names